Édouard Manet (1832–1883) was a French painter.

Manet may also refer to:

People with the surname Manet
Eugène Manet (1833–1892), French painter, brother of Édouard Manet
Jeanne Manet (1917–2012), French film actress
Julie Manet (1878–1966), French painter, niece of Édouard Manet
Raghunath Manet, Indian classical musician and dancer

MANET as an acronym
Mobile ad hoc network, a self-configuring mobile wireless network
MANET database or Molecular Ancestry Network, bioinformatics database